Mary Elizabeth Lawson ( Fisher; 27 November 1910 – 28 April 2004) was a Canadian figure skater. She competed in the ladies' singles event at the 1932 Winter Olympics.

References

External links
 

1910 births
2004 deaths
Canadian female single skaters
Olympic figure skaters of Canada
Figure skaters at the 1932 Winter Olympics
Sportspeople from London, Ontario